This is a list of moths of families starting from P to Z that are found in Metropolitan France (including Corsica). It also acts as an index to the species articles and forms part of the full List of Lepidoptera of Metropolitan France.

Family Peleopodidae

Carcina quercana (Fabricius, 1775)

Family Plutellidae

Eidophasia aereolella Lhomme, 1949
Eidophasia insulella Walsingham, 1900
Eidophasia messingiella (Fischer von Röslerstamm, 1840)
Eidophasia syenitella Herrich-Schaffer, 1854
Plutella xylostella (Linnaeus, 1758)
Plutella geniatella Zeller, 1839
Plutella huemerella (Baraniak, 2007)
Plutella porrectella (Linnaeus, 1758)
Rhigognostis annulatella (Curtis, 1832)
Rhigognostis hufnagelii (Zeller, 1839)
Rhigognostis incarnatella (Steudel, 1873)
Rhigognostis senilella (Zetterstedt, 1839)

Family Praydidae

Atemelia torquatella (Lienig & Zeller, 1846)
Distagmos ledereri Herrich-Schaffer, 1854
Prays citri (Milliere, 1873)
Prays fraxinella (Bjerkander, 1784)
Prays oleae (Bernard, 1788)
Prays ruficeps (Heinemann, 1854)

Family Prodoxidae

Lampronia aeripennella (Rebel, 1889)
Lampronia capitella (Clerck, 1759)
Lampronia corticella (Linnaeus, 1758)
Lampronia flavimitrella (Hübner, 1817)
Lampronia fuscatella (Tengstrom, 1848)
Lampronia luzella (Hübner, 1817)
Lampronia morosa Zeller, 1852
Lampronia provectella (Heyden, 1865)
Lampronia psychidella (Milliere, 1854)
Lampronia pubicornis (Haworth, 1828)
Lampronia rupella (Denis & Schiffermuller, 1775)
Lampronia standfussiella Zeller, 1852

Family Psychidae

Acanthopsyche atra (Linnaeus, 1767)
Anaproutia comitella (Bruand, 1853)
Anaproutia raiblensis (Mann, 1870)
Apterona crenulella (Bruand, 1853)
Apterona helicoidella (Vallot, 1827)
Apterona nylanderi (Wehrli, 1927)
Bacotia claustrella (Bruand, 1845)
Bankesia conspurcatella (Zeller, 1850)
Bankesia deplatsella Nel, 1999
Bankesia montanella (Walsingham, 1899)
Bijugis bombycella (Denis & Schiffermuller, 1775)
Bijugis pectinella (Denis & Schiffermuller, 1775)
Canephora hirsuta (Poda, 1761)
Dahlica argenterae (Wehrli, 1924)
Dahlica caspari Herrmann, 1984
Dahlica dorotheae Herrmann, 1981
Dahlica lazuri (Clerck, 1759)
Dahlica lichenella (Linnaeus, 1761)
Dahlica rebeli (Wehrli, 1924)
Dahlica sauteri (Hattenschwiler, 1977)
Dahlica triquetrella (Hübner, 1813)
Diplodoma laichartingella Goeze, 1783
Dissoctena granigerella Staudinger, 1859
Epichnopterix montanella Heylaerts, 1900
Epichnopterix plumella (Denis & Schiffermuller, 1775)
Epichnopterix pontbrillantella (Bruand, 1858)
Epichnopterix sieboldi (Reutti, 1853)
Eumasia parietariella (Heydenreich, 1851)
Leptopterix hirsutella (Denis & Schiffermuller, 1775)
Leptopterix plumistrella (Hübner, 1793)
Luffia ferchaultella (Stephens, 1850)
Luffia lapidella (Goeze, 1783)
Narycia astrella (Herrich-Schaffer, 1851)
Narycia duplicella (Goeze, 1783)
Narycia infernalis Herrmann, 1986
Oiketicoides febretta (Boyer de Fonscolombe, 1835)
Oreopsyche tenella (Ad. Speyer, 1862)
Pachythelia villosella (Ochsenheimer, 1810)
Penestoglossa dardoinella (Milliere, 1863)
Phalacropterix apiformis (Rossi, 1790)
Phalacropterix calberlae (Heylaerts, 1890)
Phalacropterix graminifera (Fourcroy, 1785)
Phalacropterix graslinella (Boisduval, 1852)
Phalacropterix praecellens (Staudinger, 1870)
Proutia betulina (Zeller, 1839)
Pseudobankesia alpestrella (Heinemann, 1870)
Pseudobankesia casaella Hattenschwiler, 1994
Pseudobankesia gramatella (Lhomme, 1938)
Pseudobankesia vernella (Constant, 1899)
Psyche casta (Pallas, 1767)
Psyche crassiorella Bruand, 1851
Psyche pyrenaea (Bourgogne, 1961)
Psychidea nudella (Ochsenheimer, 1810)
Ptilocephala agrostidis (Schrank, 1802)
Ptilocephala albida (Esper, 1786)
Ptilocephala leschenaulti (Staudinger, 1860)
Ptilocephala lessei (Bourgogne, 1954)
Ptilocephala muscella (Denis & Schiffermuller, 1775)
Ptilocephala plumifera (Ochsenheimer, 1810)
Ptilocephala pyrenaella (Herrich-Schaffer, 1852)
Ptilocephala sicheliella (Bruand, 1858)
Ptilocephala silphella (Milliere, 1871)
Ptilocephala vesubiella (Milliere, 1872)
Rebelia herrichiella Strand, 1912
Rebelia surientella (Bruand, 1858)
Reisseronia tarnierella (Bruand, 1851)
Siederia alpicolella (Rebel, 1919)
Siederia listerella (Linnaeus, 1758)
Sterrhopterix fusca (Haworth, 1809)
Taleporia defoliella Constant, 1895
Taleporia politella (Ochsenheimer, 1816)
Taleporia tubulosa (Retzius, 1783)
Typhonia ciliaris (Ochsenheimer, 1810)
Whittleia retiella (Newman, 1847)

Family Pterolonchidae

Pterolonche albescens Zeller, 1847
Pterolonche inspersa Staudinger, 1859

Family Pterophoridae

Adaina microdactyla (Hübner, 1813)
Agdistis adactyla (Hübner, 1819)
Agdistis bennetii (Curtis, 1833)
Agdistis frankeniae (Zeller, 1847)
Agdistis heydeni (Zeller, 1852)
Agdistis manicata Staudinger, 1859
Agdistis meridionalis (Zeller, 1847)
Agdistis neglecta Arenberger, 1976
Agdistis paralia (Zeller, 1847)
Agdistis satanas Milliere, 1875
Agdistis tamaricis (Zeller, 1847)
Amblyptilia acanthadactyla (Hübner, 1813)
Amblyptilia punctidactyla (Haworth, 1811)
Buckleria paludum (Zeller, 1839)
Calyciphora acarnella (Walsingham, 1898)
Calyciphora adamas (Constant, 1895)
Calyciphora albodactylus (Fabricius, 1794)
Calyciphora homoiodactyla (Kasy, 1960)
Calyciphora nephelodactyla (Eversmann, 1844)
Capperia britanniodactylus (Gregson, 1867)
Capperia celeusi (Frey, 1886)
Capperia fusca (O. Hofmann, 1898)
Capperia hellenica Adamczewski, 1951
Capperia loranus (Fuchs, 1895)
Capperia maratonica Adamczewski, 1951
Capperia polonica Adamczewski, 1951
Capperia trichodactyla (Denis & Schiffermuller, 1775)
Cnaemidophorus rhododactyla (Denis & Schiffermuller, 1775)
Crombrugghia distans (Zeller, 1847)
Crombrugghia kollari (Stainton, 1851)
Crombrugghia laetus (Zeller, 1847)
Crombrugghia tristis (Zeller, 1841)
Emmelina argoteles (Meyrick, 1922)
Emmelina monodactyla (Linnaeus, 1758)
Geina didactyla (Linnaeus, 1758)
Gillmeria miantodactylus (Zeller, 1841)
Gillmeria ochrodactyla (Denis & Schiffermuller, 1775)
Gillmeria pallidactyla (Haworth, 1811)
Gypsochares baptodactylus (Zeller, 1850)
Gypsochares bigoti Gibeaux & Nel, 1989
Hellinsia carphodactyla (Hübner, 1813)
Hellinsia chrysocomae (Ragonot, 1875)
Hellinsia didactylites (Strom, 1783)
Hellinsia distinctus (Herrich-Schaffer, 1855)
Hellinsia inulae (Zeller, 1852)
Hellinsia inulaevorus (Gibeaux, 1989)
Hellinsia lienigianus (Zeller, 1852)
Hellinsia osteodactylus (Zeller, 1841)
Hellinsia pectodactylus (Staudinger, 1859)
Hellinsia tephradactyla (Hübner, 1813)
Marasmarcha fauna (Milliere, 1876)
Marasmarcha lunaedactyla (Haworth, 1811)
Marasmarcha oxydactylus (Staudinger, 1859)
Merrifieldia baliodactylus (Zeller, 1841)
Merrifieldia leucodactyla (Denis & Schiffermuller, 1775)
Merrifieldia malacodactylus (Zeller, 1847)
Merrifieldia semiodactylus (Mann, 1855)
Merrifieldia tridactyla (Linnaeus, 1758)
Oidaematophorus constanti Ragonot, 1875
Oidaematophorus giganteus (Mann, 1855)
Oidaematophorus lithodactyla (Treitschke, 1833)
Oidaematophorus rogenhoferi (Mann, 1871)
Oxyptilus chrysodactyla (Denis & Schiffermuller, 1775)
Oxyptilus ericetorum (Stainton, 1851)
Oxyptilus parvidactyla (Haworth, 1811)
Oxyptilus pilosellae (Zeller, 1841)
Paraplatyptilia metzneri (Zeller, 1841)
Platyptilia calodactyla (Denis & Schiffermuller, 1775)
Platyptilia farfarellus Zeller, 1867
Platyptilia gonodactyla (Denis & Schiffermuller, 1775)
Platyptilia isodactylus (Zeller, 1852)
Platyptilia nemoralis Zeller, 1841
Platyptilia tesseradactyla (Linnaeus, 1761)
Porrittia galactodactyla (Denis & Schiffermuller, 1775)
Procapperia linariae (Chretien, 1922)
Procapperia maculatus (Constant, 1865)
Pselnophorus heterodactyla (Muller, 1764)
Pterophorus ischnodactyla (Treitschke, 1835)
Pterophorus pentadactyla (Linnaeus, 1758)
Puerphorus olbiadactylus (Milliere, 1859)
Stangeia siceliota (Zeller, 1847)
Stenoptilia annadactyla Sutter, 1988
Stenoptilia aridus (Zeller, 1847)
Stenoptilia bipunctidactyla (Scopoli, 1763)
Stenoptilia coprodactylus (Stainton, 1851)
Stenoptilia elkefi Arenberger, 1984
Stenoptilia gratiolae Gibeaux & Nel, 1990
Stenoptilia lutescens (Herrich-Schaffer, 1855)
Stenoptilia millieridactylus (Bruand, 1861)
Stenoptilia mimula Gibeaux, 1985
Stenoptilia nepetellae Bigot & Picard, 1983
Stenoptilia pelidnodactyla (Stein, 1837)
Stenoptilia pneumonanthes (Buttner, 1880)
Stenoptilia pterodactyla (Linnaeus, 1761)
Stenoptilia stigmatodactylus (Zeller, 1852)
Stenoptilia zophodactylus (Duponchel, 1840)
Stenoptilodes taprobanes (Felder & Rogenhofer, 1875)
Tabulaephorus punctinervis (Constant, 1885)
Wheeleria obsoletus (Zeller, 1841)
Wheeleria raphiodactyla (Rebel, 1901)
Wheeleria spilodactylus (Curtis, 1827)

Family Pyralidae

Achroia grisella (Fabricius, 1794)
Acrobasis advenella (Zincken, 1818)
Acrobasis bithynella Zeller, 1848
Acrobasis centunculella (Mann, 1859)
Acrobasis consociella (Hübner, 1813)
Acrobasis dulcella (Zeller, 1848)
Acrobasis fallouella (Ragonot, 1871)
Acrobasis glaucella Staudinger, 1859
Acrobasis legatea (Haworth, 1811)
Acrobasis marmorea (Haworth, 1811)
Acrobasis obliqua (Zeller, 1847)
Acrobasis obtusella (Hübner, 1796)
Acrobasis porphyrella (Duponchel, 1836)
Acrobasis repandana (Fabricius, 1798)
Acrobasis romanella (Milliere, 1870)
Acrobasis sodalella Zeller, 1848
Acrobasis suavella (Zincken, 1818)
Acrobasis tumidana (Denis & Schiffermuller, 1775)
Aglossa brabanti Ragonot, 1884
Aglossa caprealis (Hübner, 1809)
Aglossa pinguinalis (Linnaeus, 1758)
Aglossa rabatalis (de Joannis, 1923)
Alophia combustella (Herrich-Schaffer, 1855)
Amphithrix sublineatella (Staudinger, 1859)
Ancylosis arenosella (Staudinger, 1859)
Ancylosis cinnamomella (Duponchel, 1836)
Ancylosis imitella Hampson, 1901
Ancylosis morbosella Staudinger, 1879
Ancylosis oblitella (Zeller, 1848)
Ancylosis roscidella (Eversmann, 1844)
Ancylosis sareptalla (Herrich-Schaffer, 1861)
Anerastia lotella (Hübner, 1813)
Aphomia sociella (Linnaeus, 1758)
Aphomia zelleri de Joannis, 1932
Apomyelois bistriatella (Hulst, 1887)
Apomyelois ceratoniae (Zeller, 1839)
Apomyelois decolor (Zeller, 1881)
Asalebria florella (Mann, 1862)
Asalebria venustella (Ragonot, 1887)
Asarta aethiopella (Duponchel, 1837)
Asarta alpicolella (Zeller, 1839)
Asartodes monspesulalis (Duponchel, 1834)
Asartodes zapateri (Ragonot, 1882)
Assara conicolella (Constant, 1884)
Assara terebrella (Zincken, 1818)
Bostra obsoletalis (Mann, 1884)
Bradyrrhoa cantenerella (Duponchel, 1837)
Bradyrrhoa confiniella Zeller, 1848
Bradyrrhoa marianella Ragonot, 1887
Bradyrrhoa trapezella (Duponchel, 1836)
Cadra abstersella (Zeller, 1847)
Cadra calidella (Guenee, 1845)
Cadra cautella (Walker, 1863)
Cadra figulilella (Gregson, 1871)
Cadra furcatella (Herrich-Schaffer, 1849)
Catastia marginea (Denis & Schiffermuller, 1775)
Corcyra cephalonica (Stainton, 1866)
Cryptoblabes bistriga (Haworth, 1811)
Cryptoblabes gnidiella (Milliere, 1867)
Delplanqueia cortella (Constant, 1884)
Delplanqueia dilutella (Denis & Schiffermuller, 1775)
Delplanqueia inscriptella (Duponchel, 1836)
Denticera divisella (Duponchel, 1842)
Dioryctria abietella (Denis & Schiffermuller, 1775)
Dioryctria mendacella (Staudinger, 1859)
Dioryctria pineae (Staudinger, 1859)
Dioryctria robiniella (Milliere, 1865)
Dioryctria schuetzeella Fuchs, 1899
Dioryctria simplicella Heinemann, 1863
Dioryctria sylvestrella (Ratzeburg, 1840)
Eccopisa effractella Zeller, 1848
Elegia fallax (Staudinger, 1881)
Elegia similella (Zincken, 1818)
Ematheudes punctella (Treitschke, 1833)
Endotricha flammealis (Denis & Schiffermuller, 1775)
Ephestia disparella Hampson, 1901
Ephestia elutella (Hübner, 1796)
Ephestia kuehniella Zeller, 1879
Ephestia mistralella (Milliere, 1874)
Ephestia parasitella Staudinger, 1859
Ephestia unicolorella Staudinger, 1881
Ephestia welseriella (Zeller, 1848)
Epischnia adultella Zeller, 1848
Epischnia agnieleae Leraut, 2003
Epischnia asteris Staudinger, 1870
Epischnia illotella Zeller, 1839
Epischnia prodromella (Hübner, 1799)
Episcythrastis tabidella (Mann, 1864)
Episcythrastis tetricella (Denis & Schiffermuller, 1775)
Etiella zinckenella (Treitschke, 1832)
Eucarphia vinetella (Fabricius, 1787)
Eurhodope cirrigerella (Zincken, 1818)
Eurhodope cruentella (Duponchel, 1843)
Eurhodope rosella (Scopoli, 1763)
Euzophera bigella (Zeller, 1848)
Euzophera cinerosella (Zeller, 1839)
Euzophera fuliginosella (Heinemann, 1865)
Euzophera lunulella (O. Costa, 1836)
Euzophera osseatella (Treitschke, 1832)
Euzophera pinguis (Haworth, 1811)
Euzopherodes charlottae (Rebel, 1914)
Euzopherodes vapidella (Mann, 1857)
Galleria mellonella (Linnaeus, 1758)
Glyptoteles leucacrinella Zeller, 1848
Gymnancyla canella (Denis & Schiffermuller, 1775)
Gymnancyla hornigii (Lederer, 1852)
Gymnancyla ruscinonella Ragonot, 1888
Homoeosoma incognitellum Roesler, 1965
Homoeosoma inustella Ragonot, 1884
Homoeosoma nebulella (Denis & Schiffermuller, 1775)
Homoeosoma nimbella (Duponchel, 1837)
Homoeosoma sinuella (Fabricius, 1794)
Hypochalcia ahenella (Denis & Schiffermuller, 1775)
Hypochalcia decorella (Hübner, 1810)
Hypochalcia dignella (Hübner, 1796)
Hypochalcia lignella (Hübner, 1796)
Hypochalcia propinquella (Guenee, 1845)
Hypotia corticalis (Denis & Schiffermuller, 1775)
Hypotia massilialis (Duponchel, 1832)
Hypotia pectinalis (Herrich-Schaffer, 1838)
Hypsopygia costalis (Fabricius, 1775)
Hypsopygia fulvocilialis (Duponchel, 1834)
Hypsopygia glaucinalis (Linnaeus, 1758)
Hypsopygia incarnatalis (Zeller, 1847)
Hypsopygia rubidalis (Denis & Schiffermuller, 1775)
Hypsotropa limbella Zeller, 1848
Hypsotropa vulneratella (Zeller, 1847)
Isauria dilucidella (Duponchel, 1836)
Khorassania compositella (Treitschke, 1835)
Lamoria anella (Denis & Schiffermuller, 1775)
Laodamia faecella (Zeller, 1839)
Loryma egregialis (Herrich-Schaffer, 1838)
Lymphia chalybella (Eversmann, 1844)
Matilella fusca (Haworth, 1811)
Megasis rippertella (Zeller, 1839)
Merulempista cingillella (Zeller, 1846)
Merulempista ragonoti Rothschild, 1913
Merulempista turturella (Zeller, 1848)
Metallostichodes bicolorella (Heinemann, 1864)
Metallostichodes nigrocyanella (Constant, 1865)
Moitrelia hispanella Staudinger, 1859
Moitrelia italogallicella (Milliere, 1882)
Moitrelia obductella (Zeller, 1839)
Myelois circumvoluta (Fourcroy, 1785)
Myelois cribratella Zeller, 1847
Myrlaea albistrigata (Staudinger, 1881)
Nephopterix angustella (Hübner, 1796)
Neurotomia coenulentella (Zeller, 1846)
Nyctegretis aenigmella Leraut, 2002
Nyctegretis lineana (Scopoli, 1786)
Nyctegretis ruminella La Harpe, 1860
Oncocera semirubella (Scopoli, 1763)
Ortholepis betulae (Goeze, 1778)
Oxybia transversella (Duponchel, 1836)
Paralipsa gularis (Zeller, 1877)
Pempelia albariella Zeller, 1839
Pempelia alpigenella (Duponchel, 1836)
Pempelia brephiella (Staudinger, 1879)
Pempelia genistella (Duponchel, 1836)
Pempelia palumbella (Denis & Schiffermuller, 1775)
Pempeliella ardosiella (Ragonot, 1887)
Pempeliella bayassensis Leraut, 2001
Pempeliella matilella Leraut, 2001
Pempeliella ornatella (Denis & Schiffermuller, 1775)
Pempeliella sororiella Zeller, 1839
Phycita coronatella (Guenee, 1845)
Phycita metzneri (Zeller, 1846)
Phycita roborella (Denis & Schiffermuller, 1775)
Phycitodes albatella (Ragonot, 1887)
Phycitodes binaevella (Hübner, 1813)
Phycitodes eliseannae Leraut, 2002
Phycitodes gallicella Leraut, 2002
Phycitodes inquinatella (Ragonot, 1887)
Phycitodes lacteella (Rothschild, 1915)
Phycitodes maritima (Tengstrom, 1848)
Phycitodes saxicola (Vaughan, 1870)
Pima boisduvaliella (Guenee, 1845)
Plodia interpunctella (Hübner, 1813)
Pseudacrobasis nankingella Roesler, 1975
Psorosa dahliella (Treitschke, 1832)
Psorosa mediterranella Amsel, 1953
Pterothrixidia rufella (Duponchel, 1836)
Pyralis farinalis (Linnaeus, 1758)
Pyralis lienigialis (Zeller, 1843)
Pyralis regalis Denis & Schiffermuller, 1775
Raphimetopus ablutella (Zeller, 1839)
Rhodophaea formosa (Haworth, 1811)
Salebriopsis albicilla (Herrich-Schaffer, 1849)
Saluria maculivittella Ragonot, 1887
Sciota adelphella (Fischer v. Röslerstamm, 1836)
Sciota fumella (Eversmann, 1844)
Sciota hostilis (Stephens, 1834)
Sciota rhenella (Zincken, 1818)
Seeboldia korgosella Ragonot, 1887
Selagia argyrella (Denis & Schiffermuller, 1775)
Selagia fuscorubra Riel, 1928
Selagia spadicella (Hübner, 1796)
Stemmatophora borgialis (Duponchel, 1832)
Stemmatophora brunnealis (Treitschke, 1829)
Stemmatophora combustalis (Fischer v. Röslerstamm, 1842)
Stemmatophora syriacalis (Ragonot, 1895)
Synaphe antennalis (Fabricius, 1794)
Synaphe bombycalis (Denis & Schiffermuller, 1775)
Synaphe diffidalis (Guenee, 1854)
Synaphe punctalis (Fabricius, 1775)
Trachonitis cristella (Denis & Schiffermuller, 1775)
Tretopteryx pertusalis (Geyer, 1832)
Tsaraphycis mimeticella (Staudinger, 1879)
Valdovecaria bradyrrhoella Zerny, 1927
Valdovecaria hispanicella (Herrich-Schaffer, 1855)
Valdovecaria umbratella (Treitschke, 1832)
Vitula biviella (Zeller, 1848)
Zophodia grossulariella (Hübner, 1809)

Family Roeslerstammiidae

Roeslerstammia erxlebella (Fabricius, 1787)
Roeslerstammia pronubella (Denis & Schiffermuller, 1775)

Family Saturniidae

Actias isabellae (Graells, 1849)
Aglia tau (Linnaeus, 1758)
Samia cynthia (Drury, 1773)
Saturnia pavonia (Linnaeus, 1758)
Saturnia pyri (Denis & Schiffermuller, 1775)

Family Schreckensteiniidae

Schreckensteinia festaliella (Hübner, 1819)

Family Scythrididae

Enolmis acanthella (Godart, 1824)
Enolmis agenjoi Passerin d'Entreves, 1988
Episcythris triangulella (Ragonot, 1874)
Scythris adustella Jackh, 1978
Scythris amphonycella (Geyer, 1836)
Scythris anomaloptera (Staudinger, 1880)
Scythris apicalis (Zeller, 1847)
Scythris arenbergeri Passerin d'Entreves, 1986
Scythris aspromontis Jackh, 1978
Scythris bifissella (O. Hofmann, 1889)
Scythris binotiferella (Ragonot, 1880)
Scythris bornicensis Jackh, 1977
Scythris carboniella Jackh, 1978
Scythris cicadella (Zeller, 1839)
Scythris cistorum (Milliere, 1876)
Scythris clavella (Zeller, 1855)
Scythris constanti Walsingham, 1898
Scythris corsa Passerin d'Entreves, 1986
Scythris crassiuscula (Herrich-Schaffer, 1855)
Scythris cupreella (Staudinger, 1859)
Scythris cuspidella (Denis & Schiffermuller, 1775)
Scythris disparella (Tengstrom, 1848)
Scythris dissimilella (Herrich-Schaffer, 1855)
Scythris dorycniella (Milliere, 1861)
Scythris empetrella Karsholt & Nielsen, 1976
Scythris ericetella (Heinemann, 1872)
Scythris ericivorella (Ragonot, 1880)
Scythris fallacella (Schlager, 1847)
Scythris flavidella Preissecker, 1911
Scythris flavilaterella (Fuchs, 1886)
Scythris flaviventrella (Herrich-Schaffer, 1855)
Scythris fuscoaenea (Haworth, 1828)
Scythris fuscopterella Bengtsson, 1977
Scythris glacialis (Frey, 1870)
Scythris grandipennis (Haworth, 1828)
Scythris gravatella (Zeller, 1847)
Scythris heinemanni (Moschler, 1869)
Scythris imperiella Jackh, 1978
Scythris inertella (Zeller, 1855)
Scythris inspersella (Hübner, 1817)
Scythris insulella (Staudinger, 1859)
Scythris knochella (Fabricius, 1794)
Scythris lafauryi Passerin d'Entreves, 1986
Scythris laminella (Denis & Schiffermuller, 1775)
Scythris lampyrella (Constant, 1865)
Scythris lempkei Bengtsson & Langohr, 1989
Scythris lhommei Bengtsson & Passerin d'Entreves, 1988
Scythris limbella (Fabricius, 1775)
Scythris mariannae Bengtsson, 1991
Scythris meanderis Bengtsson, 1997
Scythris mediella (Constant, 1855)
Scythris mus Walsingham, 1898
Scythris noricella (Zeller, 1843)
Scythris obscurella (Scopoli, 1763)
Scythris palustris (Zeller, 1855)
Scythris parafuscoaenea Bengtsson, 1991
Scythris pascuella (Zeller, 1855)
Scythris penicillata (Chretien, 1900)
Scythris picaepennis (Haworth, 1828)
Scythris potentillella (Zeller, 1847)
Scythris productella (Zeller, 1839)
Scythris punctivittella (O. Costa, 1836)
Scythris ridiculella Caradja, 1920
Scythris rouxella (Constant, 1865)
Scythris sappadensis Bengtsson, 1992
Scythris saxella Bengtsson, 1991
Scythris schawerdae Rebel, 1931
Scythris schleichiella (Zeller, 1870)
Scythris scipionella (Staudinger, 1859)
Scythris scopolella (Linnaeus, 1767)
Scythris scorpionella Jackh, 1977
Scythris seliniella (Zeller, 1839)
Scythris siccella (Zeller, 1839)
Scythris speyeri (Heinemann & Wocke, 1876)
Scythris subseliniella (Heinemann, 1876)
Scythris subsiccella Bengtsson, 1997
Scythris tabidella (Herrich-Schaffer, 1855)
Scythris tenuivittella (Stainton, 1867)
Scythris tergestinella (Zeller, 1855)
Scythris tributella (Zeller, 1847)
Scythris vartianae Kasy, 1962
Scythris ventosella Chretien, 1907
Scythris vittella (O. Costa, 1834)

Family Sesiidae

Bembecia albanensis (Rebel, 1918)
Bembecia fibigeri Z. Lastuvka & A. Lastuvka, 1994
Bembecia himmighoffeni (Staudinger, 1866)
Bembecia iberica Spatenka, 1992
Bembecia ichneumoniformis (Denis & Schiffermuller, 1775)
Bembecia megillaeformis (Hübner, 1813)
Bembecia psoraleae Bartsch & Bettag, 1997
Bembecia scopigera (Scopoli, 1763)
Bembecia sirphiformis (Lucas, 1849)
Bembecia tunetana (Le Cerf, 1920)
Bembecia uroceriformis (Treitschke, 1834)
Chamaesphecia aerifrons (Zeller, 1847)
Chamaesphecia anthraciformis (Rambur, 1832)
Chamaesphecia bibioniformis (Esper, 1800)
Chamaesphecia dumonti Le Cerf, 1922
Chamaesphecia empiformis (Esper, 1783)
Chamaesphecia euceraeformis (Ochsenheimer, 1816)
Chamaesphecia leucopsiformis (Esper, 1800)
Chamaesphecia mysiniformis (Boisduval, 1840)
Chamaesphecia nigrifrons (Le Cerf, 1911)
Chamaesphecia osmiaeformis (Herrich-Schaffer, 1848)
Chamaesphecia palustris Kautz, 1927
Chamaesphecia ramburi (Staudinger, 1866)
Chamaesphecia tenthrediniformis (Denis & Schiffermuller, 1775)
Paranthrene insolitus Le Cerf, 1914
Paranthrene tabaniformis (Rottemburg, 1775)
Pennisetia hylaeiformis (Laspeyres, 1801)
Pyropteron affinis (Staudinger, 1856)
Pyropteron chrysidiformis (Esper, 1782)
Pyropteron hispanica (Kallies, 1999)
Pyropteron leucomelaena (Zeller, 1847)
Pyropteron meriaeformis (Boisduval, 1840)
Pyropteron muscaeformis (Esper, 1783)
Pyropteron triannuliformis (Freyer, 1843)
Sesia apiformis (Clerck, 1759)
Sesia bembeciformis (Hübner, 1806)
Sesia melanocephala Dalman, 1816
Synanthedon andrenaeformis (Laspeyres, 1801)
Synanthedon cephiformis (Ochsenheimer, 1808)
Synanthedon codeti (Oberthur, 1881)
Synanthedon conopiformis (Esper, 1782)
Synanthedon culiciformis (Linnaeus, 1758)
Synanthedon flaviventris (Staudinger, 1883)
Synanthedon formicaeformis (Esper, 1783)
Synanthedon loranthi (Kralicek, 1966)
Synanthedon melliniformis (Laspeyres, 1801)
Synanthedon mesiaeformis (Herrich-Schaffer, 1846)
Synanthedon myopaeformis (Borkhausen, 1789)
Synanthedon scoliaeformis (Borkhausen, 1789)
Synanthedon soffneri Spatenka, 1983
Synanthedon spheciformis (Denis & Schiffermuller, 1775)
Synanthedon spuleri (Fuchs, 1908)
Synanthedon stomoxiformis (Hübner, 1790)
Synanthedon tipuliformis (Clerck, 1759)
Synanthedon vespiformis (Linnaeus, 1761)
Tinthia tineiformis (Esper, 1789)

Family Sphingidae

Acherontia atropos (Linnaeus, 1758)
Agrius convolvuli (Linnaeus, 1758)
Daphnis nerii (Linnaeus, 1758)
Deilephila elpenor (Linnaeus, 1758)
Deilephila porcellus (Linnaeus, 1758)
Hemaris fuciformis (Linnaeus, 1758)
Hemaris tityus (Linnaeus, 1758)
Hippotion celerio (Linnaeus, 1758)
Hyles dahlii (Geyer, 1828)
Hyles euphorbiae (Linnaeus, 1758)
Hyles gallii (Rottemburg, 1775)
Hyles hippophaes (Esper, 1789)
Hyles livornica (Esper, 1780)
Hyles nicaea (de Prunner, 1798)
Hyles vespertilio (Esper, 1780)
Laothoe populi (Linnaeus, 1758)
Macroglossum stellatarum (Linnaeus, 1758)
Marumba quercus (Denis & Schiffermuller, 1775)
Mimas tiliae (Linnaeus, 1758)
Proserpinus proserpina (Pallas, 1772)
Smerinthus ocellata (Linnaeus, 1758)
Sphinx ligustri Linnaeus, 1758
Sphinx maurorum (Jordan, 1931)
Sphinx pinastri Linnaeus, 1758

Family Stathmopodidae

Neomariania partinicensis (Rebel, 1937)
Stathmopoda pedella (Linnaeus, 1761)

Family Thyrididae

Thyris fenestrella (Scopoli, 1763)

Family Tineidae

Anomalotinea liguriella (Milliere, 1879)
Archinemapogon yildizae Kocak, 1981
Ateliotum hungaricellum Zeller, 1839
Ateliotum insulare (Rebel, 1896)
Ateliotum petrinella (Herrich-Schaffer, 1854)
Cephimallota crassiflavella Bruand, 1851
Elatobia fuliginosella (Lienig & Zeller, 1846)
Eudarcia glaseri (Petersen, 1967)
Eudarcia leopoldella (O. G. Costa, 1836)
Eudarcia mensella (Walsingham, 1900)
Eudarcia nigraella (Mariani, 1937)
Eudarcia pagenstecherella (Hübner, 1825)
Euplocamus anthracinalis (Scopoli, 1763)
Haplotinea insectella (Fabricius, 1794)
Infurcitinea albicomella (Stainton, 1851)
Infurcitinea argentimaculella (Stainton, 1849)
Infurcitinea atrifasciella (Staudinger, 1871)
Infurcitinea captans Gozmany, 1960
Infurcitinea finalis Gozmany, 1959
Infurcitinea gaedikella Nel, 2003
Infurcitinea ignicomella (Zeller, 1852)
Infurcitinea italica (Amsel, 1954)
Infurcitinea klimeschi Passerin d'Entreves, 1974
Infurcitinea marcunella (Rebel, 1910)
Infurcitinea parentii Petersen, 1964
Infurcitinea roesslerella (Heyden, 1865)
Infurcitinea rumelicella (Rebel, 1903)
Infurcitinea sardica (Amsel, 1952)
Infurcitinea sardiniella Vari, 1942
Infurcitinea teriolella (Amsel, 1954)
Infurcitinea vartianae Petersen, 1962
Infurcitinea walsinghami Petersen, 1962
Ischnoscia borreonella (Milliere, 1874)
Ischnoscia pandorella (Milliere, 1880)
Karsholtia marianii (Rebel, 1936)
Lichenotinea maculata Petersen, 1957
Lichenotinea pustulatella (Zeller, 1852)
Metatinea immaculatella (Rebel, 1892)
Monopis crocicapitella (Clemens, 1859)
Monopis imella (Hübner, 1813)
Monopis laevigella (Denis & Schiffermuller, 1775)
Monopis monachella (Hübner, 1796)
Monopis obviella (Denis & Schiffermuller, 1775)
Monopis weaverella (Scott, 1858)
Montetinea montana Petersen, 1957
Morophaga choragella (Denis & Schiffermuller, 1775)
Myrmecozela ataxella (Chretien, 1905)
Myrmecozela ochraceella (Tengstrom, 1848)
Nemapogon agenjoi Petersen, 1959
Nemapogon clematella (Fabricius, 1781)
Nemapogon falstriella (Bang-Haas, 1881)
Nemapogon fuscalbella (Chretien, 1908)
Nemapogon granella (Linnaeus, 1758)
Nemapogon inconditella (Lucas, 1956)
Nemapogon nigralbella (Zeller, 1839)
Nemapogon picarella (Clerck, 1759)
Nemapogon ruricolella (Stainton, 1849)
Nemapogon variatella (Clemens, 1859)
Nemapogon wolffiella Karsholt & Nielsen, 1976
Neurothaumasia ankerella (Mann, 1867)
Niditinea fuscella (Linnaeus, 1758)
Niditinea striolella (Matsumura, 1931)
Novotinea carbonifera (Walsingham, 1900)
Novotinea liguriella Amsel, 1950
Opogona sacchari (Bojer, 1856)
Rhodobates unicolor (Staudinger, 1870)
Stenoptinea cyaneimarmorella (Milliere, 1854)
Tenaga nigripunctella (Haworth, 1828)
Tenaga rhenania (Petersen, 1962)
Tinea basifasciella Ragonot, 1895
Tinea columbariella Wocke, 1877
Tinea dubiella Stainton, 1859
Tinea flavescentella Haworth, 1828
Tinea murariella Staudinger, 1859
Tinea nonimella (Zagulajev, 1955)
Tinea pallescentella Stainton, 1851
Tinea pellionella Linnaeus, 1758
Tinea semifulvella Haworth, 1828
Tinea translucens Meyrick, 1917
Tinea trinotella Thunberg, 1794
Triaxomasia caprimulgella (Stainton, 1851)
Triaxomera fulvimitrella (Sodoffsky, 1830)
Triaxomera parasitella (Hübner, 1796)
Trichophaga bipartitella (Ragonot, 1892)
Trichophaga tapetzella (Linnaeus, 1758)

Family Tischeriidae

Coptotriche angusticollella (Duponchel, 1843)
Coptotriche gaunacella (Duponchel, 1843)
Coptotriche heinemanni (Wocke, 1871)
Coptotriche marginea (Haworth, 1828)
Tischeria decidua Wocke, 1876
Tischeria dodonaea Stainton, 1858
Tischeria ekebladella (Bjerkander, 1795)

Family Tortricidae

Acleris abietana (Hübner, 1822)
Acleris aspersana (Hübner, 1817)
Acleris bergmanniana (Linnaeus, 1758)
Acleris comariana (Lienig & Zeller, 1846)
Acleris cristana (Denis & Schiffermuller, 1775)
Acleris emargana (Fabricius, 1775)
Acleris ferrugana (Denis & Schiffermuller, 1775)
Acleris fimbriana (Thunberg, 1791)
Acleris forsskaleana (Linnaeus, 1758)
Acleris hastiana (Linnaeus, 1758)
Acleris hippophaeana (Heyden, 1865)
Acleris holmiana (Linnaeus, 1758)
Acleris hyemana (Haworth, 1811)
Acleris kochiella (Goeze, 1783)
Acleris laterana (Fabricius, 1794)
Acleris lipsiana (Denis & Schiffermuller, 1775)
Acleris literana (Linnaeus, 1758)
Acleris logiana (Clerck, 1759)
Acleris lorquiniana (Duponchel, 1835)
Acleris maccana (Treitschke, 1835)
Acleris notana (Donovan, 1806)
Acleris permutana (Duponchel, 1836)
Acleris quercinana (Zeller, 1849)
Acleris rhombana (Denis & Schiffermuller, 1775)
Acleris roscidana (Hübner, 1799)
Acleris rufana (Denis & Schiffermuller, 1775)
Acleris scabrana (Denis & Schiffermuller, 1775)
Acleris schalleriana (Linnaeus, 1761)
Acleris shepherdana (Stephens, 1852)
Acleris sparsana (Denis & Schiffermuller, 1775)
Acleris umbrana (Hübner, 1799)
Acleris variegana (Denis & Schiffermuller, 1775)
Acroclita subsequana (Herrich-Schaffer, 1851)
Adoxophyes orana (Fischer v. Röslerstamm, 1834)
Aethes ardezana (Muller-Rutz, 1922)
Aethes beatricella (Walsingham, 1898)
Aethes bilbaensis (Rossler, 1877)
Aethes cnicana (Westwood, 1854)
Aethes deaurana (Peyerimhoff, 1877)
Aethes decimana (Denis & Schiffermuller, 1775)
Aethes deutschiana (Zetterstedt, 1839)
Aethes dilucidana (Stephens, 1852)
Aethes fennicana (M. Hering, 1924)
Aethes flagellana (Duponchel, 1836)
Aethes francillana (Fabricius, 1794)
Aethes hartmanniana (Clerck, 1759)
Aethes kindermanniana (Treitschke, 1830)
Aethes languidana (Mann, 1855)
Aethes margaritana (Haworth, 1811)
Aethes margarotana (Duponchel, 1836)
Aethes moribundana (Staudinger, 1859)
Aethes pemeantensis Gibeaux, 1985
Aethes piercei Obraztsov, 1952
Aethes rubigana (Treitschke, 1830)
Aethes rutilana (Hübner, 1817)
Aethes sanguinana (Treitschke, 1830)
Aethes smeathmanniana (Fabricius, 1781)
Aethes tesserana (Denis & Schiffermuller, 1775)
Aethes tornella (Walsingham, 1898)
Aethes triangulana (Treitschke, 1835)
Aethes williana (Brahm, 1791)
Agapeta hamana (Linnaeus, 1758)
Agapeta largana (Rebel, 1906)
Agapeta zoegana (Linnaeus, 1767)
Aleimma loeflingiana (Linnaeus, 1758)
Ancylis achatana (Denis & Schiffermuller, 1775)
Ancylis apicella (Denis & Schiffermuller, 1775)
Ancylis badiana (Denis & Schiffermuller, 1775)
Ancylis comptana (Frolich, 1828)
Ancylis geminana (Donovan, 1806)
Ancylis laetana (Fabricius, 1775)
Ancylis mitterbacheriana (Denis & Schiffermuller, 1775)
Ancylis myrtillana (Treitschke, 1830)
Ancylis obtusana (Haworth, 1811)
Ancylis selenana (Guenee, 1845)
Ancylis sparulana (Staudinger, 1859)
Ancylis uncella (Denis & Schiffermuller, 1775)
Ancylis unculana (Haworth, 1811)
Ancylis unguicella (Linnaeus, 1758)
Ancylis upupana (Treitschke, 1835)
Aneuxanthis locupletana (Hübner, 1819)
Aphelia viburniana (Denis & Schiffermuller, 1775)
Aphelia ferugana (Hübner, 1793)
Aphelia paleana (Hübner, 1793)
Aphelia unitana (Hübner, 1799)
Apotomis capreana (Hübner, 1817)
Apotomis infida (Heinrich, 1926)
Apotomis lineana (Denis & Schiffermuller, 1775)
Apotomis sauciana (Frolich, 1828)
Apotomis semifasciana (Haworth, 1811)
Apotomis sororculana (Zetterstedt, 1839)
Apotomis turbidana Hübner, 1825
Archips crataegana (Hübner, 1799)
Archips oporana (Linnaeus, 1758)
Archips podana (Scopoli, 1763)
Archips rosana (Linnaeus, 1758)
Archips xylosteana (Linnaeus, 1758)
Argyroploce arbutella (Linnaeus, 1758)
Argyroploce externa (Eversmann, 1844)
Argyroploce noricana (Herrich-Schaffer, 1851)
Argyrotaenia ljungiana (Thunberg, 1797)
Aterpia anderreggana Guenee, 1845
Aterpia corticana (Denis & Schiffermuller, 1775)
Avaria hyerana (Milliere, 1858)
Bactra bactrana (Kennel, 1901)
Bactra furfurana (Haworth, 1811)
Bactra lancealana (Hübner, 1799)
Bactra robustana (Christoph, 1872)
Bactra venosana (Zeller, 1847)
Barbara herrichiana Obraztsov, 1960
Cacoecimorpha pronubana (Hübner, 1799)
Capricornia boisduvaliana (Duponchel, 1836)
Capua vulgana (Frolich, 1828)
Celypha aurofasciana (Haworth, 1811)
Celypha capreolana (Herrich-Schaffer, 1851)
Celypha cespitana (Hübner, 1817)
Celypha doubledayana (Barrett, 1872)
Celypha flavipalpana (Herrich-Schaffer, 1851)
Celypha lacunana (Denis & Schiffermuller, 1775)
Celypha rivulana (Scopoli, 1763)
Celypha rosaceana Schlager, 1847
Celypha rufana (Scopoli, 1763)
Celypha rurestrana (Duponchel, 1843)
Celypha siderana (Treitschke, 1835)
Celypha striana (Denis & Schiffermuller, 1775)
Celypha woodiana (Barrett, 1882)
Choristoneura diversana (Hübner, 1817)
Choristoneura hebenstreitella (Muller, 1764)
Choristoneura lafauryana (Ragonot, 1875)
Choristoneura murinana (Hübner, 1799)
Clavigesta purdeyi (Durrant, 1911)
Clavigesta sylvestrana (Curtis, 1850)
Clepsis consimilana (Hübner, 1817)
Clepsis dumicolana (Zeller, 1847)
Clepsis neglectana (Herrich-Schaffer, 1851)
Clepsis pallidana (Fabricius, 1776)
Clepsis rogana (Guenee, 1845)
Clepsis rurinana (Linnaeus, 1758)
Clepsis senecionana (Hübner, 1819)
Clepsis siciliana (Ragonot, 1894)
Clepsis spectrana (Treitschke, 1830)
Clepsis steineriana (Hübner, 1799)
Clepsis unicolorana (Duponchel, 1835)
Cnephasia alticolana (Herrich-Schaffer, 1851)
Cnephasia asseclana (Denis & Schiffermuller, 1775)
Cnephasia bizensis Real, 1953
Cnephasia chrysantheana (Duponchel, 1843)
Cnephasia communana (Herrich-Schaffer, 1851)
Cnephasia conspersana Douglas, 1846
Cnephasia cupressivorana (Staudinger, 1871)
Cnephasia ecullyana Real, 1951
Cnephasia fragosana (Zeller, 1847)
Cnephasia fulturata Rebel, 1940
Cnephasia genitalana Pierce & Metcalfe, 1922
Cnephasia longana (Haworth, 1811)
Cnephasia pasiuana (Hübner, 1799)
Cnephasia sedana (Constant, 1884)
Cnephasia stephensiana (Doubleday, 1849)
Cnephasia abrasana (Duponchel, 1843)
Cnephasia incertana (Treitschke, 1835)
Cochylidia heydeniana (Herrich-Schaffer, 1851)
Cochylidia implicitana (Wocke, 1856)
Cochylidia rupicola (Curtis, 1834)
Cochylidia subroseana (Haworth, 1811)
Cochylimorpha alternana (Stephens, 1834)
Cochylimorpha cultana (Lederer, 1855)
Cochylimorpha decolorella (Zeller, 1839)
Cochylimorpha elongana (Fischer v. Röslerstamm, 1839)
Cochylimorpha erlebachi Huemer & Trematerra, 1997
Cochylimorpha halophilana (Christoph, 1872)
Cochylimorpha hilarana (Herrich-Schaffer, 1851)
Cochylimorpha jucundana (Treitschke, 1835)
Cochylimorpha meridiana (Staudinger, 1859)
Cochylimorpha perfusana (Guenee, 1845)
Cochylimorpha peucedana (Ragonot, 1889)
Cochylimorpha straminea (Haworth, 1811)
Cochylimorpha tiraculana (Bassi & Scaramozzino, 1989)
Cochylimorpha woliniana (Schleich, 1868)
Cochylis atricapitana (Stephens, 1852)
Cochylis dubitana (Hübner, 1799)
Cochylis epilinana Duponchel, 1842
Cochylis flaviciliana (Westwood, 1854)
Cochylis hoffmannana (Kearfott, 1907)
Cochylis hybridella (Hübner, 1813)
Cochylis molliculana Zeller, 1847
Cochylis nana (Haworth, 1811)
Cochylis pallidana Zeller, 1847
Cochylis posterana Zeller, 1847
Cochylis roseana (Haworth, 1811)
Cochylis salebrana (Mann, 1862)
Commophila aeneana (Hübner, 1800)
Corticivora piniana (Herrich-Schaffer, 1851)
Crocidosema plebejana Zeller, 1847
Cydia adenocarpi (Ragonot, 1875)
Cydia albipicta (Sauter, 1968)
Cydia amplana (Hübner, 1800)
Cydia conicolana (Heylaerts, 1874)
Cydia coniferana (Saxesen, 1840)
Cydia corollana (Hübner, 1823)
Cydia cosmophorana (Treitschke, 1835)
Cydia derrai Prose, 1988
Cydia duplicana (Zetterstedt, 1839)
Cydia exquisitana (Rebel, 1889)
Cydia fagiglandana (Zeller, 1841)
Cydia ilipulana (Walsingham, 1903)
Cydia illutana (Herrich-Schaffer, 1851)
Cydia indivisa (Danilevsky, 1963)
Cydia inquinatana (Hübner, 1800)
Cydia interscindana (Moschler, 1866)
Cydia intexta (Kuznetsov, 1962)
Cydia leguminana (Lienig & Zeller, 1846)
Cydia medicaginis (Kuznetsov, 1962)
Cydia microgrammana (Guenee, 1845)
Cydia millenniana (Adamczewski, 1967)
Cydia nigricana (Fabricius, 1794)
Cydia pactolana (Zeller, 1840)
Cydia pomonella (Linnaeus, 1758)
Cydia semicinctana (Kennel, 1901)
Cydia servillana (Duponchel, 1836)
Cydia splendana (Hübner, 1799)
Cydia strigulatana (Kennel, 1899)
Cydia strobilella (Linnaeus, 1758)
Cydia succedana (Denis & Schiffermuller, 1775)
Cydia ulicetana (Haworth, 1811)
Cydia vallesiaca (Sauter, 1968)
Cymolomia hartigiana (Saxesen, 1840)
Diceratura amaranthica Razowski, 1963
Diceratura infantana (Kennel, 1899)
Diceratura ostrinana (Guenee, 1845)
Diceratura rhodograpta Djakonov, 1929
Diceratura roseofasciana (Mann, 1855)
Dichrorampha acuminatana (Lienig & Zeller, 1846)
Dichrorampha aeratana (Pierce & Metcalfe, 1915)
Dichrorampha agilana (Tengstrom, 1848)
Dichrorampha alexandrae Passerin d'Entreves, 1972
Dichrorampha alpigenana (Heinemann, 1863)
Dichrorampha alpinana (Treitschke, 1830)
Dichrorampha bugnionana (Duponchel, 1843)
Dichrorampha cacaleana (Herrich-Schaffer, 1851)
Dichrorampha chavanneana (de La Harpe, 1858)
Dichrorampha consortana Stephens, 1852
Dichrorampha distinctana (Heinemann, 1863)
Dichrorampha eximia (Danilevsky, 1948)
Dichrorampha flavidorsana Knaggs, 1867
Dichrorampha forsteri Obraztsov, 1953
Dichrorampha gemellana (Zeller, 1847)
Dichrorampha gruneriana (Herrich-Schaffer, 1851)
Dichrorampha harpeana Frey, 1870
Dichrorampha heegerana (Duponchel, 1843)
Dichrorampha incursana (Herrich-Schaffer, 1851)
Dichrorampha ligulana (Herrich-Schaffer, 1851)
Dichrorampha montanana (Duponchel, 1843)
Dichrorampha petiverella (Linnaeus, 1758)
Dichrorampha plumbagana (Treitschke, 1830)
Dichrorampha plumbana (Scopoli, 1763)
Dichrorampha sedatana Busck, 1906
Dichrorampha senectana Guenee, 1845
Dichrorampha sequana (Hübner, 1799)
Dichrorampha simpliciana (Haworth, 1811)
Dichrorampha sylvicolana Heinemann, 1863
Dichrorampha thomanni Huemer, 1991
Dichrorampha vancouverana McDunnough, 1935
Ditula angustiorana (Haworth, 1811)
Ditula joannisiana (Ragonot, 1888)
Eana clercana (de Joannis, 1908)
Eana cottiana (Chretien, 1898)
Eana cyanescana (Real, 1953)
Eana derivana (de La Harpe, 1858)
Eana incanana (Stephens, 1852)
Eana jaechki Razowski, 1959
Eana joannisi (Schawerda, 1929)
Eana nevadensis (Schawerda, 1929)
Eana penziana (Thunberg, 1791)
Eana viardi (Real, 1953)
Eana argentana (Clerck, 1759)
Eana osseana (Scopoli, 1763)
Eana canescana (Guenee, 1845)
Eana filipjevi (Real, 1953)
Enarmonia formosana (Scopoli, 1763)
Endothenia ericetana (Humphreys & Westwood, 1845)
Endothenia gentianaeana (Hübner, 1799)
Endothenia lapideana (Herrich-Schaffer, 1851)
Endothenia marginana (Haworth, 1811)
Endothenia nigricostana (Haworth, 1811)
Endothenia oblongana (Haworth, 1811)
Endothenia pauperculana (Staudinger, 1859)
Endothenia pullana (Haworth, 1811)
Endothenia quadrimaculana (Haworth, 1811)
Endothenia ustulana (Haworth, 1811)
Epagoge grotiana (Fabricius, 1781)
Epiblema chretieni Obraztsov, 1952
Epiblema costipunctana (Haworth, 1811)
Epiblema foenella (Linnaeus, 1758)
Epiblema grandaevana (Lienig & Zeller, 1846)
Epiblema graphana (Treitschke, 1835)
Epiblema hepaticana (Treitschke, 1835)
Epiblema inulivora (Meyrick, 1932)
Epiblema sarmatana (Christoph, 1872)
Epiblema scutulana (Denis & Schiffermuller, 1775)
Epiblema similana (Denis & Schiffermuller, 1775)
Epiblema simploniana (Duponchel, 1835)
Epiblema sticticana (Fabricius, 1794)
Epiblema turbidana (Treitschke, 1835)
Epinotia abbreviana (Fabricius, 1794)
Epinotia bilunana (Haworth, 1811)
Epinotia brunnichana (Linnaeus, 1767)
Epinotia caprana (Fabricius, 1798)
Epinotia cedricida Diakonoff, 1969
Epinotia crenana (Hübner, 1799)
Epinotia cruciana (Linnaeus, 1761)
Epinotia dalmatana (Rebel, 1891)
Epinotia demarniana (Fischer v. Röslerstamm, 1840)
Epinotia festivana (Hübner, 1799)
Epinotia fraternana (Haworth, 1811)
Epinotia granitana (Herrich-Schaffer, 1851)
Epinotia immundana (Fischer v. Röslerstamm, 1839)
Epinotia maculana (Fabricius, 1775)
Epinotia mercuriana (Frolich, 1828)
Epinotia nanana (Treitschke, 1835)
Epinotia nemorivaga (Tengstrom, 1848)
Epinotia nigricana (Herrich-Schaffer, 1851)
Epinotia nisella (Clerck, 1759)
Epinotia pusillana (Peyerimhoff, 1863)
Epinotia pygmaeana (Hübner, 1799)
Epinotia ramella (Linnaeus, 1758)
Epinotia rubiginosana (Herrich-Schaffer, 1851)
Epinotia signatana (Douglas, 1845)
Epinotia solandriana (Linnaeus, 1758)
Epinotia sordidana (Hübner, 1824)
Epinotia subocellana (Donovan, 1806)
Epinotia subsequana (Haworth, 1811)
Epinotia tedella (Clerck, 1759)
Epinotia tenerana (Denis & Schiffermuller, 1775)
Epinotia tetraquetrana (Haworth, 1811)
Epinotia thapsiana (Zeller, 1847)
Epinotia trigonella (Linnaeus, 1758)
Eriopsela quadrana (Hübner, 1813)
Eucosma aemulana (Schlager, 1849)
Eucosma albidulana (Herrich-Schaffer, 1851)
Eucosma albuneana (Zeller, 1847)
Eucosma aspidiscana (Hübner, 1817)
Eucosma balatonana (Osthelder, 1937)
Eucosma campoliliana (Denis & Schiffermuller, 1775)
Eucosma cana (Haworth, 1811)
Eucosma conterminana (Guenee, 1845)
Eucosma cumulana (Guenee, 1845)
Eucosma diakonoffi Gibeaux, 1984
Eucosma fervidana (Zeller, 1847)
Eucosma gradensis (Galvagni, 1909)
Eucosma hohenwartiana (Denis & Schiffermuller, 1775)
Eucosma incinerana (Constant, 1888)
Eucosma lacteana (Treitschke, 1835)
Eucosma luciana (Chretien, 1908)
Eucosma lugubrana (Treitschke, 1830)
Eucosma metzneriana (Treitschke, 1830)
Eucosma mirificana (Peyerimhoff, 1876)
Eucosma monstratana (Rebel, 1906)
Eucosma obumbratana (Lienig & Zeller, 1846)
Eucosma parvulana (Wilkinson, 1859)
Eucosma pupillana (Clerck, 1759)
Eucosma rubescana (Constant, 1895)
Eucosma tripoliana (Barrett, 1880)
Eucosma wimmerana (Treitschke, 1835)
Eucosmomorpha albersana (Hübner, 1813)
Eudemis porphyrana (Hübner, 1799)
Eudemis profundana (Denis & Schiffermuller, 1775)
Eugnosta lathoniana (Hübner, 1800)
Eugnosta magnificana (Rebel, 1914)
Eugnosta parreyssiana (Duponchel, 1843)
Eulia ministrana (Linnaeus, 1758)
Eupoecilia ambiguella (Hübner, 1796)
Eupoecilia angustana (Hübner, 1799)
Eupoecilia cebrana (Hübner, 1813)
Eupoecilia sanguisorbana (Herrich-Schaffer, 1856)
Exapate duratella Heyden, 1864
Falseuncaria degreyana (McLachlan, 1869)
Falseuncaria ruficiliana (Haworth, 1811)
Fulvoclysia nerminae Kocak, 1982
Gibberifera simplana (Fischer v. Röslerstamm, 1836)
Grapholita andabatana (Wolff, 1957)
Grapholita funebrana Treitschke, 1835
Grapholita janthinana (Duponchel, 1843)
Grapholita lobarzewskii (Nowicki, 1860)
Grapholita molesta (Busck, 1916)
Grapholita tenebrosana Duponchel, 1843
Grapholita aureolana Tengstrom, 1848
Grapholita caecana Schlager, 1847
Grapholita compositella (Fabricius, 1775)
Grapholita coronillana Lienig & Zeller, 1846
Grapholita delineana Walker, 1863
Grapholita difficilana (Walsingham, 1900)
Grapholita discretana Wocke, 1861
Grapholita fissana (Frolich, 1828)
Grapholita gemmiferana Treitschke, 1835
Grapholita internana (Guenee, 1845)
Grapholita jungiella (Clerck, 1759)
Grapholita lathyrana (Hübner, 1822)
Grapholita lunulana (Denis & Schiffermuller, 1775)
Grapholita nebritana Treitschke, 1830
Grapholita orobana Treitschke, 1830
Grapholita pallifrontana Lienig & Zeller, 1846
Gravitarmata margarotana (Heinemann, 1863)
Gynnidomorpha alismana (Ragonot, 1883)
Gynnidomorpha luridana (Gregson, 1870)
Gynnidomorpha minimana (Caradja, 1916)
Gynnidomorpha permixtana (Denis & Schiffermuller, 1775)
Gynnidomorpha rubricana (Peyerimhoff, 1877)
Gypsonoma aceriana (Duponchel, 1843)
Gypsonoma dealbana (Frolich, 1828)
Gypsonoma imparana (Muller-Rutz, 1914)
Gypsonoma minutana (Hübner, 1799)
Gypsonoma nitidulana (Lienig & Zeller, 1846)
Gypsonoma oppressana (Treitschke, 1835)
Gypsonoma sociana (Haworth, 1811)
Hedya dimidiana (Clerck, 1759)
Hedya nubiferana (Haworth, 1811)
Hedya ochroleucana (Frolich, 1828)
Hedya pruniana (Hübner, 1799)
Hedya salicella (Linnaeus, 1758)
Hysterophora maculosana (Haworth, 1811)
Isotrias hybridana (Hübner, 1817)
Isotrias rectifasciana (Haworth, 1811)
Isotrias stramentana (Guenee, 1845)
Lathronympha strigana (Fabricius, 1775)
Lepteucosma huebneriana Kocak, 1980
Lobesia abscisana (Doubleday, 1849)
Lobesia artemisiana (Zeller, 1847)
Lobesia bicinctana (Duponchel, 1844)
Lobesia botrana (Denis & Schiffermuller, 1775)
Lobesia helichrysana (Ragonot, 1879)
Lobesia indusiana (Zeller, 1847)
Lobesia limoniana (Milliere, 1860)
Lobesia littoralis (Westwood & Humphreys, 1845)
Lobesia porrectana (Zeller, 1847)
Lobesia quaggana Mann, 1855
Lobesia reliquana (Hübner, 1825)
Lobesia euphorbiana (Freyer, 1842)
Lobesia occidentis Falkovitsh, 1970
Lozotaenia forsterana (Fabricius, 1781)
Lozotaenia mabilliana (Ragonot, 1875)
Lozotaenia straminea (Schawerda, 1936)
Lozotaeniodes brusseauxi Gibeaux, 1999
Lozotaeniodes cupressana (Duponchel, 1836)
Lozotaeniodes formosana (Frolich, 1830)
Metendothenia atropunctana (Zetterstedt, 1839)
Neosphaleroptera nubilana (Hübner, 1799)
Notocelia cynosbatella (Linnaeus, 1758)
Notocelia incarnatana (Hübner, 1800)
Notocelia roborana (Denis & Schiffermuller, 1775)
Notocelia rosaecolana (Doubleday, 1850)
Notocelia tetragonana (Stephens, 1834)
Notocelia trimaculana (Haworth, 1811)
Notocelia uddmanniana (Linnaeus, 1758)
Olethreutes arcuella (Clerck, 1759)
Olindia schumacherana (Fabricius, 1787)
Orthotaenia undulana (Denis & Schiffermuller, 1775)
Oxypteron exiguana (de La Harpe, 1860)
Oxypteron schawerdai (Rebel, 1936)
Pammene albuginana (Guenee, 1845)
Pammene amygdalana (Duponchel, 1842)
Pammene argyrana (Hübner, 1799)
Pammene aurana (Fabricius, 1775)
Pammene aurita Razowski, 1991
Pammene blockiana (Herrich-Schaffer, 1851)
Pammene cocciferana Walsingham, 1903
Pammene cytisana (Zeller, 1847)
Pammene epanthista (Meyrick, 1922)
Pammene fasciana (Linnaeus, 1761)
Pammene gallicana (Guenee, 1845)
Pammene germmana (Hübner, 1799)
Pammene giganteana (Peyerimhoff, 1863)
Pammene insulana (Guenee, 1845)
Pammene juniperana (Milliere, 1858)
Pammene luedersiana (Sorhagen, 1885)
Pammene obscurana (Stephens, 1834)
Pammene ochsenheimeriana (Lienig & Zeller, 1846)
Pammene oxycedrana (Milliere, 1876)
Pammene populana (Fabricius, 1787)
Pammene purpureana Constant, 1888
Pammene querceti (Gozmany, 1957)
Pammene regiana (Zeller, 1849)
Pammene rhediella (Clerck, 1759)
Pammene salvana (Staudinger, 1859)
Pammene spiniana (Duponchel, 1843)
Pammene splendidulana (Guenee, 1845)
Pammene suspectana (Lienig & Zeller, 1846)
Pammene trauniana (Denis & Schiffermuller, 1775)
Pandemis cerasana (Hübner, 1786)
Pandemis chondrillana (Herrich-Schaffer, 1860)
Pandemis cinnamomeana (Treitschke, 1830)
Pandemis corylana (Fabricius, 1794)
Pandemis dumetana (Treitschke, 1835)
Pandemis heparana (Denis & Schiffermuller, 1775)
Paramesia gnomana (Clerck, 1759)
Pelatea klugiana (Freyer, 1836)
Pelochrista agrestana (Treitschke, 1830)
Pelochrista caecimaculana (Hübner, 1799)
Pelochrista decolorana (Freyer, 1842)
Pelochrista fulvostrigana (Constant, 1888)
Pelochrista fusculana (Zeller, 1847)
Pelochrista hepatariana (Herrich-Schaffer, 1851)
Pelochrista infidana (Hübner, 1824)
Pelochrista mancipiana (Mann, 1855)
Pelochrista modicana (Zeller, 1847)
Pelochrista mollitana (Zeller, 1847)
Pelochrista sordicomana (Staudinger, 1859)
Phalonidia affinitana (Douglas, 1846)
Phalonidia albipalpana (Zeller, 1847)
Phalonidia contractana (Zeller, 1847)
Phalonidia curvistrigana (Stainton, 1859)
Phalonidia gilvicomana (Zeller, 1847)
Phalonidia manniana (Fischer v. Röslerstamm, 1839)
Phaneta pauperana (Duponchel, 1843)
Phiaris astrana (Guenee, 1845)
Phiaris bipunctana (Fabricius, 1794)
Phiaris helveticana Duponchel, 1844
Phiaris metallicana (Hübner, 1799)
Phiaris micana (Denis & Schiffermuller, 1775)
Phiaris obsoletana (Zetterstedt, 1839)
Phiaris palustrana (Lienig & Zeller, 1846)
Phiaris schulziana (Fabricius, 1776)
Phiaris scoriana (Guenee, 1845)
Phiaris stibiana (Guenee, 1845)
Phiaris turfosana (Herrich-Schaffer, 1851)
Phiaris umbrosana (Freyer, 1842)
Phiaris valesiana (Rebel, 1907)
Phtheochroa cymatodana (Rebel, 1927)
Phtheochroa duponchelana (Duponchel, 1843)
Phtheochroa durbonana (Lhomme, 1937)
Phtheochroa frigidana (Guenee, 1845)
Phtheochroa fulvicinctana (Constant, 1893)
Phtheochroa inopiana (Haworth, 1811)
Phtheochroa purana (Guenee, 1845)
Phtheochroa rugosana (Hübner, 1799)
Phtheochroa schreibersiana (Frolich, 1828)
Phtheochroa sodaliana (Haworth, 1811)
Piniphila bifasciana (Haworth, 1811)
Pristerognatha fuligana (Denis & Schiffermuller, 1775)
Pristerognatha penthinana (Guenee, 1845)
Prochlidonia amiantana (Hübner, 1799)
Propiromorpha rhodophana (Herrich-Schaffer, 1851)
Pseudargyrotoza conwagana (Fabricius, 1775)
Pseudococcyx posticana (Zetterstedt, 1839)
Pseudococcyx tessulatana (Staudinger, 1871)
Pseudococcyx turionella (Linnaeus, 1758)
Pseudohermenias abietana (Fabricius, 1787)
Pseudosciaphila branderiana (Linnaeus, 1758)
Ptycholoma lecheana (Linnaeus, 1758)
Retinia perangustana (Snellen, 1883)
Retinia resinella (Linnaeus, 1758)
Rhopobota myrtillana (Humphreys & Westwood, 1845)
Rhopobota naevana (Hübner, 1817)
Rhopobota stagnana (Denis & Schiffermuller, 1775)
Rhopobota ustomaculana (Curtis, 1831)
Rhyacionia buoliana (Denis & Schiffermuller, 1775)
Rhyacionia duplana (Hübner, 1813)
Rhyacionia maritimana Prose, 1981
Rhyacionia miniatana (Staudinger, 1871)
Rhyacionia pinicolana (Doubleday, 1849)
Rhyacionia pinivorana (Lienig & Zeller, 1846)
Rolandylis maiana (Kearfott, 1907)
Selania leplastriana (Curtis, 1831)
Selania resedana (Obraztsov, 1959)
Selenodes karelica (Tengstrom, 1875)
Sparganothis pilleriana (Denis & Schiffermuller, 1775)
Spatalistis bifasciana (Hübner, 1787)
Spilonota laricana (Heinemann, 1863)
Spilonota ocellana (Denis & Schiffermuller, 1775)
Stictea mygindiana (Denis & Schiffermuller, 1775)
Strophedra nitidana (Fabricius, 1794)
Strophedra weirana (Douglas, 1850)
Syndemis musculana (Hübner, 1799)
Thiodia citrana (Hübner, 1799)
Thiodia couleruana (Duponchel, 1834)
Thiodia lerneana (Treitschke, 1835)
Thiodia major (Rebel, 1903)
Thiodia torridana (Lederer, 1859)
Thiodia trochilana (Frolich, 1828)
Thiodiodes seeboldi (Rossler, 1877)
Tortricodes alternella (Denis & Schiffermuller, 1775)
Tortrix viridana Linnaeus, 1758
Tosirips magyarus Razowski, 1987
Xerocnephasia rigana (Sodoffsky, 1829)
Zeiraphera griseana (Hübner, 1799)
Zeiraphera isertana (Fabricius, 1794)
Zeiraphera ratzeburgiana (Saxesen, 1840)
Zeiraphera rufimitrana (Herrich-Schaffer, 1851)

Family Urodidae

Wockia asperipunctella (Bruand, 1851)

Family Yponomeutidae
Cedestis gysseleniella Zeller, 1839
Cedestis subfasciella (Stephens, 1834)
Euhyponomeuta stannella (Thunberg, 1788)
Euhyponomeutoides albithoracellus Gaj, 1954
Euhyponomeutoides ribesiella (de Joannis, 1900)
Kessleria albescens (Rebel, 1899)
Kessleria albomaculata Huemer & Tarmann, 1992
Kessleria alpmaritimae Huemer & Mutanen, 2015
Kessleria alternans (Staudinger, 1871)
Kessleria brachypterella Huemer & Tarmann, 1992
Kessleria cottiensis Huemer & Mutanen, 2015
Kessleria dimorpha Huemer & Mutanen, 2015
Kessleria inexpectata Huemer & Tarmann, 1992
Kessleria pyrenaea Friese, 1960
Kessleria saxifragae (Stainton, 1868)
Kessleria wehrlii Huemer & Tarmann, 1992
Niphonympha dealbatella (Zeller, 1847)
Ocnerostoma friesei Svensson, 1966
Ocnerostoma piniariella Zeller, 1847
Paradoxus osyridellus Stainton, 1869
Parahyponomeuta egregiella (Duponchel, 1839)
Paraswammerdamia albicapitella (Scharfenberg, 1805)
Paraswammerdamia conspersella (Tengstrom, 1848)
Paraswammerdamia nebulella (Goeze, 1783)
Pseudoswammerdamia combinella (Hübner, 1786)
Scythropia crataegella (Linnaeus, 1767)
Swammerdamia caesiella (Hübner, 1796)
Swammerdamia compunctella Herrich-Schaffer, 1855
Swammerdamia pyrella (Villers, 1789)
Yponomeuta cagnagella (Hübner, 1813)
Yponomeuta evonymella (Linnaeus, 1758)
Yponomeuta irrorella (Hübner, 1796)
Yponomeuta mahalebella Guenee, 1845
Yponomeuta malinellus Zeller, 1838
Yponomeuta padella (Linnaeus, 1758)
Yponomeuta plumbella (Denis & Schiffermuller, 1775)
Yponomeuta rorrella (Hübner, 1796)
Yponomeuta sedella Treitschke, 1832
Zelleria abisella (Chretien, 1910)
Zelleria hepariella Stainton, 1849
Zelleria oleastrella (Milliere, 1864)

Family Ypsolophidae

Ochsenheimeria bubalella (Hübner, 1813)
Ochsenheimeria glabratella Muller-Rutz, 1914
Ochsenheimeria taurella (Denis & Schiffermuller, 1775)
Ochsenheimeria urella Fischer von Röslerstamm, 1842
Ochsenheimeria vacculella Fischer von Röslerstamm, 1842
Phrealcia eximiella (Rebel, 1899)
Ypsolopha alpella (Denis & Schiffermuller, 1775)
Ypsolopha asperella (Linnaeus, 1761)
Ypsolopha chazariella (Mann, 1866)
Ypsolopha dentella (Fabricius, 1775)
Ypsolopha divisella (Chretien, 1915)
Ypsolopha falcella (Denis & Schiffermuller, 1775)
Ypsolopha horridella (Treitschke, 1835)
Ypsolopha indecorella (Rebel, 1903)
Ypsolopha instabilella (Mann, 1866)
Ypsolopha lucella (Fabricius, 1775)
Ypsolopha mucronella (Scopoli, 1763)
Ypsolopha nemorella (Linnaeus, 1758)
Ypsolopha parenthesella (Linnaeus, 1761)
Ypsolopha persicella (Fabricius, 1787)
Ypsolopha scabrella (Linnaeus, 1761)
Ypsolopha sequella (Clerck, 1759)
Ypsolopha sylvella (Linnaeus, 1767)
Ypsolopha ustella (Clerck, 1759)
Ypsolopha vittella (Linnaeus, 1758)

Family Zygaenidae

Adscita albanica (Naufock, 1926)
Adscita alpina (Alberti, 1937)
Adscita geryon (Hübner, 1813)
Adscita statices (Linnaeus, 1758)
Adscita mannii (Lederer, 1853)
Aglaope infausta (Linnaeus, 1767)
Jordanita hispanica (Alberti, 1937)
Jordanita chloros (Hübner, 1813)
Jordanita globulariae (Hübner, 1793)
Jordanita subsolana (Staudinger, 1862)
Jordanita budensis (Ad. & Au. Speyer, 1858)
Jordanita notata (Zeller, 1847)
Rhagades pruni (Denis & Schiffermuller, 1775)
Theresimima ampellophaga (Bayle-Barelle, 1808)
Zygaena carniolica (Scopoli, 1763)
Zygaena fausta (Linnaeus, 1767)
Zygaena hilaris Ochsenheimer, 1808
Zygaena occitanica (Villers, 1789)
Zygaena brizae (Esper, 1800)
Zygaena contaminei Boisduval, 1834
Zygaena corsica Boisduval, 1828
Zygaena cynarae (Esper, 1789)
Zygaena erythrus (Hübner, 1806)
Zygaena minos (Denis & Schiffermuller, 1775)
Zygaena purpuralis (Brunnich, 1763)
Zygaena sarpedon (Hübner, 1790)
Zygaena anthyllidis Boisduval, 1828
Zygaena ephialtes (Linnaeus, 1767)
Zygaena exulans (Hohenwarth, 1792)
Zygaena filipendulae (Linnaeus, 1758)
Zygaena lavandulae (Esper, 1783)
Zygaena lonicerae (Scheven, 1777)
Zygaena loti (Denis & Schiffermuller, 1775)
Zygaena nevadensis Rambur, 1858
Zygaena osterodensis Reiss, 1921
Zygaena rhadamanthus (Esper, 1789)
Zygaena romeo Duponchel, 1835
Zygaena transalpina (Esper, 1780)
Zygaena trifolii (Esper, 1783)
Zygaena viciae (Denis & Schiffermuller, 1775)

References 

Moths